Maricopa Colony is a census-designated place (CDP) in Maricopa County, Arizona, United States, located in the federally recognized Gila River Indian Community. The population was 854 at the 2020 census, up from 709 at the 2010 census. It is located on the southern side of the Phoenix metropolitan area, around Baseline Road and 83rd Avenue.

Demographics 

As of the census of 2010, there were 709 people living in the CDP. The racial makeup of the CDP was 1% White, 92% Native American, 4% from other races, and 3% from two or more races. 14% of the population were Hispanic or Latino of any race.

Transportation
Gila River Transit connects Maricopa Colony with Komatke.

Notes

Arizona placenames of Native American origin
Census-designated places in Maricopa County, Arizona
Gila River Indian Community